Prisaca may refer to several villages in Romania:

 Prisaca, a village in Berești-Tazlău Commune, Bacău County
 Prisaca, a village in Uileacu de Beiuș Commune, Bihor County
 Prisaca, a village in Constantin Daicoviciu Commune, Caraș-Severin County
 Prisaca, a village in Vulpeni Commune, Olt County
 Prisaca, a village in Valea Sării Commune, Vrancea County
 Prisaca Dornei, a village in Vama Commune, Suceava County

and to:
 Prisaca, a village in Hîrtop Commune, Cimişlia district, Moldova

See also
Priseaca